Road Trips Volume 1 Number 1 is a live album by the Grateful Dead.  It contains highlights from their fall 1979 tour of the East Coast.  It was released on November 5, 2007.

Track listing

Credits

Grateful Dead

 Jerry Garcia – guitar, vocals
 Mickey Hart –  drums
 Bill Kreutzmann – drums
 Phil Lesh – bass
 Brent Mydland – keyboards, vocals
 Bob Weir – guitar, vocals

Production

Produced by Grateful Dead
Compilation produced by David Lemieux and Blair Jackson
Recorded by Dan Healy
Edited and mastered by Jeffrey Norman at Garage Audio Mastering
Cover art by Scott McDougall
Photos by Jay Blakesburg, Herb Greene, Larry Hulst, and Bob Minkin
Package design by Steve Vance
Liner notes written by Blair Jackson

Sound quality

A label on the CD case for Road Trips Volume 1 Number 1 states, "The compact discs herein have been digitally remastered directly from original soundboard cassettes.  They are historical snapshots, not modern professional recordings, and may therefore exhibit occasional technical anomalies and unavoidable ravages of time."

The album was released in HDCD format.  This provides enhanced sound quality when played on CD players with HDCD capability, and is fully compatible with regular CD players.

Recording dates

Road Trips Volume 1 Number 1 contains selections from the following concerts:

New Haven Coliseum, New Haven, Connecticut, 10/25/79
Nassau Veterans Memorial Coliseum, Uniondale, New York, 10/31/79
The Spectrum, Philadelphia, Pennsylvania, 11/6/79
Capital Centre, Landover, Maryland, 11/8/79
Memorial Auditorium, Buffalo, New York, 11/9/79
Crisler Arena, Ann Arbor, Michigan, 11/10/79

References

Road Trips albums
2007 live albums